Persuasion or persuasion arts is an umbrella term for influence. Persuasion can influence a person's beliefs, attitudes, intentions, motivations, or behaviours.

Persuasion is studied in many disciplines. Rhetoric studies modes of persuasion in speech and writing and is often taught as a classical subject. Psychology looks at persuasion through the lens of individual behaviour and neuroscience studies the brain activity associated with this behaviour. History and political science are interested in the role of propaganda in shaping historical events. In business, persuasion is aimed at influencing a person's (or group's) attitude or behaviour towards some event, idea, object, or another person (s) by using written, spoken, or visual methods to convey information, feelings, or reasoning, or a combination thereof. Persuasion is also often used to pursue personal gain, such as election campaigning, giving a sales pitch,  or in trial advocacy. Persuasion can also be interpreted as using personal or positional resources to change people.

Forms 
Propaganda is a form of persuasion used to indoctrinate a population towards an individual or a particular agenda.

Coercion is a form of persuasion that uses aggressive threats and the provocation of fear and/or shame to influence a person's behavior.

Systematic persuasion is the process through which attitudes or beliefs are leveraged by appeals to logic and reason.

Heuristic persuasion, on the other hand, is the process through which attitudes or beliefs are leveraged by appeals to habit or emotion.

History and philosophy

The academic study of persuasion began with the Greeks, who emphasized rhetoric and elocution as the highest standard for a successful politician. All trials were held in front of the Assembly, and the likelihood of success of the prosecution versus the defense rested on the persuasiveness of the speaker.  Rhetoric is the art of effective persuasive speaking, often through the use of figures of speech, metaphors, and other techniques.

The Greek philosopher Aristotle listed four reasons why one should learn the art of persuasion:
 Truth and justice are perfect; thus if a case loses, it is the fault of the speaker.
 It is an excellent tool for teaching.
 A good rhetorician must be able to argue both sides to understand the whole problem, and
 There is no better way to defend one's self.

He described three fundamental ways to communicate persuasively:

Ethos (credibility): refers to the effort to convince your audience of your credibility or character.
Logos (reason): refers to the effort to convince your audience by using logic and reason.
Pathos (emotion): refers to the effort to persuade your audience by making an appeal to their feelings.

Ethics of persuasion 
Many philosophers have commented on the morality of persuasion. Socrates argued that rhetoric was based on appearances rather than the essence of a matter. Thomas Hobbes was critical of use rhetoric to create controversy, particularly the use of metaphor. Immanuel Kant was critical of rhetoric, arguing that it could cause people to reach conclusions that are at odds with those that they would have reached if they had applied their full judgment. He draws parallels between the function of rhetoric and the deterministic function of the mind like a machine.

Aristotle was critical of persuasion, though argued that judges would often allow themselves to be persuaded by choosing to apply emotions rather than reason. However, he argued that persuasion could be used to induce an individual to apply reason and judgment.

Writers such as William Keith and Christian O. Lundberg argue that uses of force and threats in trying to influence others doesn't lead to persuasion, but rather talking to people does, going further to add "While Rhetoric certainly has its dark side that deals in tricks and perceptions... the systematic study of rhetoric generally ignores these techniques, in part because they are not very systematic or reliable." There is also in legal disputes, the matter of the burden of proof when bringing up an argument, where it often falls on the hands of the one presenting a case to prove its validity to another person and where presumptions may be made where of the burden of proof hasn't been met, an argument may be dropped such as in a more famous example of "Innocent until proven guilty", although this line of presumption or burden of proof may not always be followed. While Keith and Lundberg do go into detail about the different intricacies of persuasion, they do explain that lapses in logic and or reasoning could lead to persuasive arguments with faults. These faults can come as enthymemes, where more likely than not only certain audiences with specific pieces of knowledge may understand the reasoning being presented with missing logic, or the more egregious example of fallacies where conclusions may be drawn (almost always incorrectly) through invalid argument.

Theories
There are many psychological theories for what influences an individuals behaviour in different situations. These theories will have implications about how persuasion works.

Attribution theory 

Humans attempt to explain the actions of others through either dispositional attribution or situational attribution.

Dispositional attribution, also referred to as internal attribution, attempts to point to a person's traits, abilities, motives, or dispositions as a cause or explanation for their actions. A citizen criticizing a president by saying the nation is lacking economic progress and health because the president is either lazy or lacking in economic intuition is utilizing a dispositional attribution.

Situational attribution, also referred to as external attribution, attempts to point to the context around the person and factors of his surroundings, particularly things that are completely out of his control.  A citizen claiming that a lack of economic progress is not a fault of the president but rather the fact that he inherited a poor economy from the previous president is situational attribution.

A fundamental attribution error occurs when people wrongly attribute either a shortcoming or accomplishment to internal factors while disregarding all external factors. In general, people use dispositional attribution more often than situational attribution when trying to explain or understand the behavior of others. This happens because we focus more on the individual when we lack information about that individual's situation and context. When trying to persuade others to like us or another person, we tend to explain positive behaviors and accomplishments with dispositional attribution and negative behaviors and shortcomings with situational attributions.

Behaviour change theories
The Theory of Planned Behavior is the foremost theory of behaviour change. It has support from meta-analyses which reveals it can predict around 30% of behaviour. Theories, by nature however, prioritize internal validity, over external validity. They are coherent and therefore make for an easily reappropriated story. On the other hand, they will correspond more poorly with the evidence, and mechanics of reality, than a straightforward itemization of the behaviour change interventions (techniques) by their individual efficacy. 
These behaviour change interventions have been categorized by behavioral scientists. A mutually exclusive, comprehensively exhaustive (MECE) translation of this taxonomy, in decreasing order of effectiveness are:

 positive and negative consequences
 offering/removing incentives,
 offering/removing threats/punishments,
 distraction,
 changing exposure to cues (triggers) for the behaviour,
 prompts/cues,
 goal-setting,
 (increasing the salience of) emotional/health/social/environmental/regret consequences, 
 self-monitoring of the behaviour and outcomes of behaviour,
 mental rehearsal of successful performance (planning?), 
 self-talk,
 focus on past success,
 comparison of outcomes via persuasive argument,
 pros/cons and comparative imaging of future outcomes,
 identification of self as role model,
 self-affirmation,
 reframing,
 cognitive dissonance,
 reattribution,
 (increasing salience of) antecedents

A typical instantiations of these techniques in therapy isexposure / response prevention for OCD.

Conditioning theories

Conditioning plays a huge part in the concept of persuasion. It is more often about leading someone into taking certain actions of their own, rather than giving direct commands. In advertisements for example, this is done by attempting to connect a positive emotion to a brand/product logo. This is often done by creating commercials that make people laugh, using a sexual undertone, inserting uplifting images and/or music etc. and then ending the commercial with a brand/product logo.  Great examples of this are professional athletes.  They are paid to connect themselves to things that can be directly related to their roles; sport shoes, tennis rackets, golf balls, or completely irrelevant things like soft drinks, popcorn poppers and panty hose.  The important thing for the advertiser is to establish a connection to the consumer.

This conditioning is thought to affect how people view certain products, knowing that most purchases are made on the basis of emotion. Just like you sometimes recall a memory from a certain smell or sound, the objective of some ads is solely to bring back certain emotions when you see their logo in your local store. The hope is that repeating the message several times makes consumers more likely to purchase the product because they already connect it with a good emotion and positive experience.
Stefano DellaVigna and Matthew Gentzkow did a comprehensive study on the effects of persuasion in different domains. They discovered that persuasion has little or no effect on advertisement; however, there was a substantial effect of persuasion on voting if there was face-to-face contact.

Cognitive dissonance theory

Leon Festinger originally proposed the theory of cognitive dissonance in 1957.  He theorized that human beings constantly strive for mental consistency.  Our cognition (thoughts, beliefs, or attitudes) can be in agreement, unrelated, or in disagreement with each other. Our cognition can also be in agreement or disagreement with our behaviors.  When we detect conflicting cognition, or dissonance, it gives us a sense of incompleteness and discomfort.  For example, a person who is addicted to smoking cigarettes but also suspects it could be detrimental to their health suffers from cognitive dissonance.

Festinger suggests that we are motivated to reduce this dissonance until our cognition is in harmony with itself.  We strive for mental consistency.  There are four main ways we go about reducing or eliminating our dissonance:
 changing our minds about one of the facets of cognition
 reducing the importance of a cognition
 increasing the overlap between the two, and 
 re-evaluating the cost/reward ratio.
Revisiting the example of the smoker, they can either quit smoking, reduce the importance of their health, convince themself they are not at risk, or decide that the reward of smoking is worth the cost of their health.

Cognitive dissonance is powerful when it relates to competition and self-concept.  The most famous example of how cognitive dissonance can be used for persuasion comes from Festinger and Carlsmith's 1959 experiment in which participants were asked to complete a very dull task for an hour.  Some were paid $20, while others were paid $1, and afterwards they were instructed to tell the next waiting participants that the experiment was fun and exciting.  Those who were paid $1 were much more likely to convince the next participants that the experiment really was enjoyable than those who received $20. This is because $20 is enough reason to participate in a dull task for an hour, so there is no dissonance.  Those who received $1 experienced great dissonance, so they had to truly convince themselves that the task actually was enjoyable to avoid feeling taken advantage of, and therefore reduce their dissonance.

Elaboration likelihood model

Persuasion has traditionally been associated with two routes:
 Central route: Whereby an individual evaluates information presented to them based on the pros and cons of it and how well it supports their values
 Peripheral route: Change is mediated by how attractive the source of communication is and by bypassing the deliberation process.

The Elaboration likelihood model (ELM) forms a new facet of the route theory. It holds that the probability of effective persuasion depends on how successful the communication is at bringing to mind a relevant mental representation, which is the elaboration likelihood. Thus if the target of the communication is personally relevant, this increases the elaboration likelihood of the intended outcome and would be more persuasive if it were through the central route. Communication which does not require careful thought would be better suited to the peripheral route.

Functional theories
Functional theorists attempt to understand the divergent attitudes individuals have towards people, objects or issues in different situations. There are four main functional attitudes:
 Adjustment function: A main motivation for individuals is to increase positive external rewards and minimize the costs. Attitudes serve to direct behavior towards the rewards and away from punishment.
 Ego Defensive function: The process by which an individual protects their ego from being threatened by their own negative impulses or threatening thoughts.
 Value-expressive: When an individual derives pleasure from presenting an image of themselves which is in line with their self-concept and the beliefs that they want to be associated with.
 Knowledge function: The need to attain a sense of understanding and control over one's life. An individual's attitudes therefore serve to help set standards and rules which govern their sense of being.

When communication targets an underlying function, its degree of persuasiveness influences whether individuals change their attitude after determining that another attitude would more effectively fulfill that function.

Inoculation theory

A vaccine introduces a weak form of a virus that can easily be defeated to prepare the immune system should it need to fight off a stronger form of the same virus.  In much the same way, the theory of inoculation suggests that a certain party can introduce a weak form of an argument that is easily thwarted in order to make the audience inclined to disregard a stronger, full-fledged form of that argument from an opposing party.

This often occurs in negative advertisements and comparative advertisements—both for products and political causes.  An example would be a manufacturer of a product displaying an ad that refutes one particular claim made about a rival's product, so that when the audience sees an ad for said rival product, they refute the product claims automatically.

Narrative transportation theory

Narrative transportation theory proposes that when people lose themselves in a story, their attitudes and intentions change to reflect that story. The mental state of narrative transportation can explain the persuasive effect of stories on people, who may experience narrative transportation when certain contextual and personal preconditions are met, as Green and Brock postulate for the transportation-imagery model. Narrative transportation occurs whenever the story receiver experiences a feeling of entering a world evoked by the narrative because of empathy for the story characters and imagination of the story plot.

Social judgment theory

Social judgment theory suggests that when people are presented with an idea or any kind of persuasive proposal, their natural reaction is to immediately seek a way to sort the information subconsciously and react to it.  We evaluate the information and compare it with the attitude we already have, which is called the initial attitude or anchor point.

When trying to sort incoming persuasive information, an audience evaluates whether it lands in their latitude of acceptance, latitude of non-commitment or indifference, or the latitude of rejection.  The size of these latitudes varies from topic to topic.  Our "ego-involvement" generally plays one of the largest roles in determining the size of these latitudes.  When a topic is closely connected to how we define and perceive ourselves, or deals with anything we care passionately about, our latitudes of acceptance and non-commitment are likely to be much smaller and our attitude of rejection much larger.  A person's anchor point is considered to be the center of their latitude of acceptance, the position that is most acceptable to them.

An audience is likely to distort incoming information to fit into their unique latitudes.  If something falls within the latitude of acceptance, the subject tends to assimilate the information and consider it closer to his anchor point than it really is.  Inversely, if something falls within the latitude of rejection, the subject tends to contrast the information and convince themself the information is farther away from their anchor point than it really is.

When trying to persuade an individual target or an entire audience, it is vital to first learn the average latitudes of acceptance, non-commitment, and rejection of your audience.  It is ideal to use persuasive information that lands near the boundary of the latitude of acceptance if the goal is to change the audience's anchor point.  Repeatedly suggesting ideas on the fringe of the acceptance latitude makes people gradually adjust their anchor points, while suggesting ideas in the rejection latitude or even the non-commitment latitude does not change the audience's anchor point.

Methods 

Persuasion methods are also sometimes referred to as persuasion tactics or persuasion strategies.

Use of force
There is the use of force in persuasion, which does not have any scientific theories, except for its use to make demands. The use of force is then a precedent to the failure of less direct means of persuasion. Application of this strategy can be interpreted as a threat since the persuader does not give options to their request.

Weapons of influence
Robert Cialdini, in Influence, his book on persuasion, defined six "influence cues or weapons of influence": Influence is the process of changing.

Reciprocity

The principle of reciprocity states that when a person provides us with something, we attempt to repay them in kind. Reciprocation produces a sense of obligation, which can be a powerful tool in persuasion. The reciprocity rule is effective because it can be overpowering and instill in us a sense of obligation. Generally, we have a dislike for individuals who neglect to return a favor or provide payment when offered a free service or gift. As a result, reciprocation is a widely held principle. This societal standard makes reciprocity extremely powerful persuasive technique, as it can result in unequal exchanges and can even apply to an uninvited first favor. Reciprocity applies to the marketing field because of its use as a powerful persuasive technique. The marketing tactic of "free samples" demonstrates the reciprocity rule because of the sense of obligation that the rule produces. This sense of obligation comes from the desire to repay the marketer for the gift of a "free sample."

Commitment and consistency
Consistency is an important aspect of persuasion because it:
 is highly valued by society, 
 results in a beneficial approach to daily life, and 
 provides a valuable shortcut through the complicated nature of modern existence.
Consistency allows us to more effectively make decisions and process information. The concept of consistency states that someone who commits to something, orally or in writing, is more likely to honor that commitment. This is especially true for written commitments, as they appear psychologically more concrete and can create hard proof. Someone who commits to a stance tends to behave according to that commitment. Commitment is an effective persuasive technique, because once you get someone to commit, they are more likely to engage in self-persuasion, providing themselves and others with reasons and justifications to support their commitment in order to avoid dissonance. Cialdini notes Vietnamese brainwashing of American prisoners of war to rewrite their self-image and gain automatic unenforced compliance. Another example is children being made to repeat the Pledge of Allegiance each morning and why marketers make you close popups by saying "I'll sign up later" or "No thanks, I prefer not making money".

Social proof
Social learning, also known as social proof, is a core principle among almost all forms of persuasion. It is based on the idea of peer influence, and is considered essential for audience-centered approaches to persuasive messages. The principle of social proof suggests what people believe or do is typically learned by observing the norms of those around us. People naturally conform their actions and beliefs to fit what society expects, as the rewards for doing so are usually greater than standing out.

"The power of the crowd" is thought to be highly involved in the decisions we make. Social proof is often utilized by people in a situation that requires a decision be made. In uncertain or ambiguous situations, when multiple possibilities create choices we must make, people are likely to conform to what others do. We take cues from those around us as to what the appropriate behavior is in that moment. People often feel they will make fewer mistakes "by acting in accord with social evidence than by behaving contrary to it."

Likeness
This principle is simple and concise. People say "yes" to people that they like. Two major factors contribute to overall likeness. The first is physical attractiveness. People who are physically attractive seem more persuasive. They get what they want and they can easily change others' attitudes. This attractiveness is proven to send favorable messages/impressions of other traits that a person may have, such as talent, kindness, and intelligence. The second factor is similarity. People are more easily persuaded by others they deem as similar to themselves.

Authority
People are more prone to believing those with authority. They have the tendency to believe that if an expert says something, it must be true. People are more likely to adhere to opinions of individuals who knowledgeable and trustworthy. Although a message often stands or falls on the weight of its ideas and arguments, a person's attributes or implied authority can have a large effect on the success of their message.

In The True Believer, Eric Hoffer noted, "People whose lives are barren and insecure seem to show a greater willingness to obey than people who are self-sufficient and self-confident. To the frustrated, freedom from responsibility is more attractive than freedom from restraint. . . . They willingly abdicate the directing of their lives to those who want to plan, command and shoulder all responsibility."

In the Milgram study, a series of experiments begun in 1961, a "teacher" and a "learner" were placed in two different rooms. The "learner" was attached to an electric harness that could administer shock. The "teacher" was told by a supervisor, dressed in a white scientist's coat, to ask the learner questions and punish him when he got a question wrong. The teacher was instructed by the study supervisor to deliver an electric shock from a panel under the teacher's control. After delivery, the teacher had to up the voltage to the next notch. The voltage went up to 450 volts. The catch to this experiment was that the teacher did not know that the learner was an actor faking the pain sounds he heard and was not actually being harmed. The experiment was being done to see how obedient we are to authority. "When an authority tells ordinary people it is their job to deliver harm, how much suffering will each subject be willing to inflict on an entirely innocent other person if the instructions come 'from above'?." In this study, the results showed that the teachers were willing to give as much pain as was available to them. The conclusion was that people are willing to bring pain upon others when they are directed to do so by some authority figure.

Scarcity
Scarcity could play an important role in the process of persuasion. When something has limited availability, people assign it more value. As one of the six basic principles behind the science of persuasion, then, "scarcity" can be leveraged to convince people to buy into some suggestions, heed the advice or accept the business proposals. According to Robert Cialdini, Regents' Professor of Psychology and Marketing at Arizona State University and Distinguished Professor of Marketing in the W. P. Carey School, whatever is rare, uncommon or dwindling in availability — this idea of scarcity — confers value on objects, or even relationships.

There are two major reasons why the scarcity principle works:
 When things are difficult to get, they are usually more valuable, so that can make it seem to have better quality.
 When things become less available, we could lose the chance to acquire them.
When this happens, people usually assign the scarce item or service more value simply because it is harder to acquire. This principle is that everyone wants things that are out of their reach. Something easily available is not that desirable as something very rare.

Manipulation
Individuals high on the Machiavellianism trait have tendencies to engage in manipulation and deceit to gain self benefits for themselves.

List of methods 
By appeal to reason:
 Logic
 Logical argument
 Rhetoric
 Scientific evidence (proof)
 Scientific method

By appeal to emotion:
 Cosmetic Advertising
 Presentation and Imagination
 Pity
 Propaganda
 Manipulation (psychology)
 Seduction
 Tradition

Aids to persuasion:
 Body language
 Communication skill or Rhetoric
 Personality tests and conflict style inventory help devise strategy based on an individual's preferred style of interaction
 Sales techniques

Other techniques:
 Deception
 Hypnosis
 Power (social and political)
 Subliminal advertising

Coercive techniques, some of which are highly controversial or not scientifically proven effective:
 Brainwashing
 Coercive persuasion
 Force
 Mind control
 Torture

In culture 
It is through a basic cultural personal definition of persuasion that everyday people understand how others are attempting to influence them and then how they influence others. The dialogue surrounding persuasion is constantly evolving because of the necessity to use persuasion in everyday life. Persuasion tactics traded in society have influences from researchers, which may sometimes be misinterpreted.
To keep evolutionary advantage, in the sense of wealth and survival, you must persuade and not be persuaded. To understand cultural persuasion, researchers gather knowledge from domains such as "buying, selling, advertising, and shopping, as well as parenting and courting."

Methods of persuasion vary by culture, both in prevalence and effectiveness. For example, advertisements tend to appeal to different values according to whether they are used in collectivistic or individualistic cultures.

Persuasion Knowledge Model (PKM)
The Persuasion Knowledge Model (PKM) was created by Friestad and Wright in 1994. This framework allows the researchers to analyze the process of gaining and using everyday persuasion knowledge. The researchers suggest the necessity of including "the relationship and interplay between everyday folk knowledge and scientific knowledge on persuasion, advertising, selling, and marketing in general."

To educate the general population about research findings and new knowledge about persuasion, a teacher must draw on their pre-existing beliefs from folk persuasion to make the research relevant and informative to lay people, which creates "mingling of their scientific insights and commonsense beliefs."

As a result of this constant mingling, the issue of persuasion expertise becomes messy. Expertise status can be interpreted from a variety of sources like job titles, celebrity, or published scholarship.

It is through this multimodal process that we create concepts like, "Stay away from car salesmen, they will try to trick you." The kind of persuasion techniques blatantly employed by car salesmen creates an innate distrust of them in popular culture. According to Psychology Today, they employ tactics ranging from making personal life ties with the customer to altering reality by handing the customer the new car keys before the purchase.

Campbell proposed and empirically demonstrated that some persuasive advertising approaches lead consumers to infer manipulative intent on the marketer's part. Once consumers infer manipulative intent, they are less persuaded by the marketer, as indicated by attenuated advertising attitudes, brand attitudes and purchase intentions. Campbell and Kirmani developed an explicit model of the conditions under which consumers use persuasion knowledge in evaluating influence agents such as salespersons.

Neurobiology

An article showed that EEG measures of anterior prefrontal asymmetry might be a predictor of persuasion.  Research participants were presented with arguments that favored and arguments that opposed the attitudes they already held.  Those whose brain was more active in left prefrontal areas said that they paid the most attention to statements with which they agreed while those with a more active right prefrontal area said that they paid attention to statements that disagreed.  This is an example of defensive repression, the avoidance or forgetting of unpleasant information.  Research has shown that the trait of defensive repression is related to relative left prefrontal activation.  In addition, when pleasant or unpleasant words, probably analogous to agreement or disagreement, were seen incidental to the main task, an fMRI scan showed preferential left prefrontal activation to the pleasant words.

One way therefore to increase persuasion would seem to be to selectively activate the right prefrontal cortex.  This is easily done by monaural stimulation to the contralateral ear.  The effect apparently depends on selective attention rather than merely the source of stimulation.  This manipulation had the expected outcome: more persuasion for messages coming from the left.

See also

References

Further reading
Cialdini, Robert B. "Harnessing the Science of Persuasion" (Archive). Harvard Business Review. October 2001.
Druckman, James N. 2022. "A Framework for the Study of Persuasion." Annual Review of Political Science.
Herbert I. Abelson, Persuasion: How opinions and attitudes are changed, Springer Publishing Company, 1965
Jacquelyn Kegley and Krzysztof Piotr Skowroński, eds.  Persuasion and Compulsion in Democracy, Lexington 2013.
Richard E. Vatz, The Only Authentic Book of Persuasion, Kendall Hunt, 2013

External links

 
Attitude change
Belief